Amara Traoré (born 25 September 1965) is a Senegalese former professional footballer who is the head coach of Horoya AC in the Guinée Championnat National.

He managed the Senegal national team and ASC Linguère in Senegal.

Playing career
Traoré played for several teams, including SC Bastia, FC Gueugnon, FC Metz, all in France.

He also played for the Senegal national team and was a participant at the 2002 FIFA World Cup.

Managerial career
Traoré was named Senegal manager in December 2009, and he was in charge of the national team for more than two years, until February 2012. In March 2013, he took the head coaching job with the Guinean side AS Kaloum.

Honours
Gueugnon
 Coupe de la Ligue: 1999–2000

References

External links

Living people
1965 births
Sportspeople from Saint-Louis, Senegal
Association football forwards
Senegalese footballers
Senegal international footballers
2002 FIFA World Cup players
SC Bastia players
Le Mans FC players
LB Châteauroux players
FC Gueugnon players
FC Metz players
Al Wahda FC players
Ligue 1 players
Ligue 2 players
1994 African Cup of Nations players
ASC Linguère players
2002 African Cup of Nations players
Senegalese football managers
Senegal national football team managers
2012 Africa Cup of Nations managers
Horoya AC managers
Senegalese expatriate footballers
Senegalese expatriate football managers
Senegalese expatriate sportspeople in France
Expatriate footballers in France
Senegalese expatriate sportspeople in the United Arab Emirates
Expatriate footballers in the United Arab Emirates
Senegalese expatriate sportspeople in Guinea
Expatriate football managers in Guinea